Merbecovirus is a subgenus of viruses in the genus Betacoronavirus, including the human pathogen Middle East respiratory syndrome–related coronavirus (MERS-CoV). The viruses in this subgenus were previously known as group 2c coronaviruses.

Structure
The viruses of this subgenus, like other coronaviruses, have a lipid bilayer envelope in which the membrane (M), envelope (E) and spike (S) structural proteins are anchored.

See also
Embecovirus (group 2a)
Sarbecovirus (group 2b)
Nobecovirus (group 2d)

References

 
Virus subgenera
Betacoronaviruses